The Audenshaw Reservoirs were constructed between 1877 and 1882 by Manchester Corporation. They are located between Audenshaw and Denton, in Greater Manchester, England. Their construction was overseen by John Frederick Bateman. Part of the village of Audenshaw was demolished to make way for the three reservoirs. Also destroyed to allow their construction was a section of Nico Ditch.

Description
Reservoir number 3 was partly filled in during the 1990s, to make way for the M60 (formerly the M66) motorway.

The reservoirs are currently maintained by United Utilities plc and are not open to the general public. However, it is possible to obtain a permit to visit the reservoirs for leisure use. More recently, the reservoirs have been fenced off to the public, in preparation for the creation of a sailing club on the water.

See also
List of reservoirs and dams in the United Kingdom

References

Notes

Bibliography

External links
Tameside Unitary Development Plan
Audenshaw Local History Society (Currently no mention of the reservoir)
Tameside Council

Tameside
Drinking water reservoirs in England
Works by John Frederick Bateman
Reservoirs in Greater Manchester
Audenshaw